The first Philippine municipal elections were in 1895.

In 1893, the Maura Law was passed to reorganize town governments with the aim of making them more effective and autonomous. The law changed the title of chief executive of the town from gobernadorcillo to capitan municipal.

Under the Maura Law, Luzon and Visayas were divided into provinces, which is administered by a governor, assisted by the provincial council (junta provincial). Each province was divided into towns (pueblos), whose affairs were managed by the municipal councils with the aid of principales. The towns were in turn divided and subdivided into wards (barrios), headed by tenientes del barrio, and barangays under cabezas de barangay.

Fully implemented in 1895, the Maura Law was the most laudable Spanish reform in Philippine local government in its time. It gave the Filipinos greater participation in the administration of their affairs.

References 

1895
1895 elections in the Philippines